The Putative Archaeal 2 TMS Holin (A2-Hol) Family (TC# 9.B.109) consists of a few putative holins from Nitrososphaerota ranging in size from about 130 to 165 amino acyl residues (aas) and exhibiting 2 transmembrane segments (TMSs). A representative list of proteins belonging to the A2-Hol family can be found in the Transporter Classification Database. The archaeon, Candidatus Nitrosoarchaeum limnia, encodes adjacent genes designated Toxin Secretion/Lysis Holin.  The "toxin" gene encodes a soluble protein of 325 aas stated as belonging to the "Glycosyltransferase GBT-type Superfamily".  This protein brings up other glycosyltransferases in a NCBI BLAST search. The adjacent gene encodes a small protein of 132 aas and 2 TMSs  (TC# 9.B.109.1.1) that could be a holin, based on its size and topology. This protein has the UniProt accession number of S2E3C4. Paralogues are found in this same organism (Candidatus Nitrosoarchaeum koreensis) and other closely related species.

See also 
 Holin
 Lysin
 Transporter Classification Database

Further reading 
 Saier, Milton H.; Reddy, Bhaskara L. (2015-01-01). "Holins in Bacteria, Eukaryotes, and Archaea: Multifunctional Xenologues with Potential Biotechnological and Biomedical Applications". Journal of Bacteriology 197(1): 7–17. . . . .
 Wang, I. N.; Smith, D. L.; Young, R. (2000-01-01). "Holins: the protein clocks of bacteriophage infections". Annual Review of Microbiology 54: 799–825. . . .

References 

Protein families
Membrane proteins
Transmembrane proteins
Transmembrane transporters
Transport proteins
Integral membrane proteins
Holins